The Saint Ignatius Jesuit College of Excellence (in Hungarian: Szent Ignác Jezsuita Szakkollégium (SZIK)) in Budapest, Hungary, in the VIII. district is a college of excellence established in 1990. It is run by the  Jesuits. It has 60 members of which 15-20 are exchanged every year due to graduation and admission. The important values of SZIK are professionality, spirituality, community and self-government.

History of SZIK 

In September 1990, some enthusiastic college students formed the first community, which became the founding team of the future college. The institution did not have a building at that time, in order to acquire one, a property of the disbanded Kispest Workers' Militia was tendered and won.

In search for a long-term maintainer, the choice fell on the St. Martin’s Foundation, which was committed to promoting the education of the youth and later took on the role of maintainer. However, as the young people also wanted to provide spiritual care, the Jesuit order was later asked to do so.

The order appointed Szabolcs Sajgó SJ, the editor of the spirituality magazine Heart (Szív), as the first pastor of the dormitory, and he held the position of director for three years. After a two-year break, a Jesuit called László Vértesaljai SJ became the director again, followed by Kiss Ulrich SJ, the relationship between the college and the order deepened: On August 20 1998, János Ádám SJ Provincial Superior decided, that the Society of Jesus assumes responsibility for the College. With the appointment of the Jesuit rector Kiss Ulrich in 2005, another decision was made to add the adjective “Jesuit” to the name of the college. In the autumn of 2011, the College moved to Horánszky Street under the direction of Rector Dr. Péter Smuk. Between 2012 and 2017, Dr. Botond Feledy served as Rector. From September 2017, the head of the college is Balázs Sárvári.

Sources
 SZIK english website
 SZIK about us

See also
 List of Jesuit sites
 Jesuit universities and colleges